Hajji Aqam Ali Kandi (also Romanized as Ḩājjī Āqām ʿAlī Kandī; also known as Ḩājjī Āqā Kandī) is a village in Qeshlaq-e Jonubi Rural District, Qeshlaq Dasht District, Bileh Savar County, Ardabil Province, Iran. At the 2006 census, its population was 48, in 9 families.

References 

Towns and villages in Bileh Savar County